Sir Frederick John Llewellyn KCMG (29 April 1915 – 15 November 1988) was an English chemist and academic administrator who spent some of his career in New Zealand.

Biography
Llewellyn was born in 1915. His father was Ernest Barrett Llewellyn. He received his education at Dursley Grammar School. He attended the University of Birmingham, from where he graduated with a BSc (1st class honours). At the same university, he received a PhD and a DSc.

He lectured at Birkbeck College in London in chemistry from 1939 to 1945. From 1941 to 1946, he researched explosives for the Ministry of Supply. He was a research fellow for Imperial Chemical Industries (ICI) from 1946 to 1947. In 1947, he moved to the University of Auckland to take the Chair in Chemistry and stayed there until 1955. From 1956 to 1961, he was at the University of Canterbury to become their first Vice-Chancellor and Rector. From 1962 to 1965, he was chairman of the New Zealand Broadcasting Corporation.

He returned to the UK to become the Vice-Chancellor at the University of Exeter from 1966 to 1972. Following Exeter, he became Director General of the British Council.

In 1962, Llewellyn was one of the three inaugural recipients of an honorary doctorate from the University of Canterbury, receiving a Legum Doctor (LLD). In 1966, Victoria University of Wellington conferred the same honorary degree on him. In the 1974 Birthday Honours, he was appointed a Knight Commander of the Order of St Michael and St George (KCMG).

Family and death
In 1939, he married Joyce Barrett; they were to have one son and one daughter. He died on 15 November 1988.

See also
List of honorary doctors of the University of Canterbury
List of honorary doctors of Victoria University of Wellington

References

1915 births
1988 deaths
Academics of Birkbeck, University of London
Academic staff of the University of Auckland
Vice-Chancellors of the University of Exeter
Vice-Chancellors of the University of Canterbury
People of the British Council